Danny Wright is an American Pianist who has sold over 11 million albums (stats as of 2019) since his debut in 1986.  He has been named twice by Billboard magazine as a Top 10 artist in the New-age music genre, with three of his albums in Billboard's Top 10 New Age Albums for three consecutive years. Over the years, Wright’s repertoire has also encompassed other genres. Danny Wright has performed all over the world, including The Jack Singer Concert Hall in Calgary, Canada, The Liberace Museum in Las Vegas, Nevada, The Parliament of Religions in Salt Lake City, Utah, and The Smith Center in Las Vegas, Nevada. At The Smith Center, Danny headlined the Jazz Cabaret Room for many years, and performed a concert in their largest auditorium with Ventriloquist Terry Fator. Legendary Portrait Artist Alan Mercer approached Danny Wright to be featured on Alan Mercer's Celebrity Blog. Danny's Interview and Pictures were first featured on Alan Mercer's Blog on April 24th, 2022 on amprofile.blogspot.com. As of April 2022, Danny has released a grand total of 55 Piano Music Albums.

Discography

Albums

References
Recent press release
Various CD reviews at MainlyPiano.com

External links
Official site 

Year of birth missing (living people)
Living people
American classical pianists
Male classical pianists
American male pianists
Composers for piano
Easy listening musicians
Light music composers
New-age pianists
Postmodern composers
Smooth jazz pianists
Male classical composers
21st-century classical pianists
21st-century American male musicians
American male jazz musicians
21st-century American pianists